The miR-199 microRNA precursor is a short non-coding RNA
gene involved in gene regulation.
miR-199 genes have now been predicted or experimentally confirmed in mouse, human and a further 21 other species. microRNAs are transcribed as ~70 nucleotide precursors and subsequently processed by the Dicer enzyme to give a ~22 nucleotide product. The mature products are thought to have regulatory roles through complementarity to mRNA.

Origin and evolution of miR-199
miR-199 has been shown to be a vertebrate specific miR family that emerge at the origin of the vertebrate lineage  Three paralogs of miR-199 can usually be found in non-teleost vertebrate species and 4 to 5 copies in the teleost species. All miR-199 genes are located on opposite strand of orthologous intron of Dynamin genes. Within Dynamin3 gene (Dnm3), miR-199 is associated with miR-214 and both miRs are transcribed together as a common primary transcript, demonstrated in mouse, human and zebrafish.

Targets and expression of miR-199
miR-199 has been shown to be implicated in a wide variety of cellular and developmental mechanisms such as various cancer development and progression, cardiomyocytes protection or skeletal formation.

Using microarray and immunoblotting analyses it has been shown that miR-199a* targets the Met proto-oncogene.

MicroRNA hsa-miR-199a is a regulator of  IκB kinase-β (IKKβ) expression.

Using TaqMan real-time quantitative PCR array methods, miRNA expression has been profiled. miR-199a, one of the most significantly overexpressed in invasive squamous cell carcinomas  (ISCCs), was evaluated by transfecting cervical cancer cells (SiHa and ME-180) with anti-miR-199a oligonucleotides and the cell viability assessed.
mirR-199a*, mir199a and mirR-199b were significantly overexpressed in ISCCs.

Implication of miR-199 in skeletogenesis
miR-199, along with its cluster mate MiR-214, has been shown to be implicated in skeleton formation. In mice, miR-199 is expressed in perichondrial cells, periarticular chondrocytes, tracheal cartilage, limb mesenchyme, and most tissues in the upper and lower jaw. In zebrafish, miR-199 is expressed in the developing notochord and in all tissues surrounding developing skeletal elements. Comparative miRNA array led to the isolation of several Bone Morphogenic Protein 2 (BMP2)-responsive miRNAs. Among them, miR-199a* is of particular interest, because it was reported to be specifically expressed in the skeletal system and was shown to inhibit chondrogenesis by down-regulation of Smad1, a major regulator of bone and cartilage formation and development. Also, Twist-1, which is a major actor in skeleton formation, regulates miR-199 and miR-214 cluster expression in mouse. Furthermore, miR199-214 cluster deletion in mouse lead to skeletal development abnormalities including craniofacial defects, neural arch and spinous processes malformations, and osteopenia.

Clinical relevance of miR-199
Alcoholic liver disease is a common medical consequence of long-term excessive alcohol use. Activation of hypoxia-Inducible Factor-1α (HIF-1α) is an indicator of hypoxia. Endothelin-1 (ET-1) is a protein that constricts blood vessels and raises blood pressure. It has been shown that ethanol-induced miR-199 down-regulation may contribute to augmented HIF-1α and ET-1 expression.

References

Further reading

External links 
 
 miRBase family MIPF0000040

MicroRNA